Tomáš Berdych was the defending champion, but lost to Stan Wawrinka in the final, 6–4, 3–6, 4–6.

Seeds

 Andy Murray (quarterfinals)
 Milos Raonic (semifinals)
 Tomáš Berdych (final)
 Stan Wawrinka (champion)
 Grigor Dimitrov (second round)
 Ernests Gulbis (first round)
 Roberto Bautista Agut (second round)
 Gilles Simon (semifinals)

Draw

Finals

Top half

Bottom half

Qualifying

Seeds

 Jan-Lennard Struff (first round)
 Andrey Kuznetsov (qualified)
 Andrey Golubev (first round)
 Jürgen Melzer (qualifying competition)
 Paul-Henri Mathieu (qualified)
 Tobias Kamke (qualifying competition, lucky loser)
 Marsel İlhan (first round)
 James Ward (withdrew)

Qualifiers

Lucky losers
  Tobias Kamke

Qualifying draw

First qualifier

Second qualifier

Third qualifier

Fourth qualifier

External links
 Main draw
 Qualifying draw

2015 ABN AMRO World Tennis Tournament
ABN AMRO World Tennis Tournament - Men's Singles